Sangeeth Sivan is an Indian film director and screenwriter who works in Malayalam and Hindi film industries. He is probably best known for directing the 1992 Malayalam film Yodha.

Sangeeth Sivan is the eldest son of filmmaker Sivan. His brothers Santosh Sivan and Sanjeev Sivan also work in the industry. He started his career when Basu Bhattacharya brought him on board as the executive producer of his son's directorial debut Raakh, starring Aamir Khan and Pankaj Kapur. He soon made his directorial debut with the Malayalam film Vyooham which was well noticed. It was through the successful Yodha that he established himself as a leading director in Malayalam. After directing more than half a dozen Malayalam films, he directed his first Bollywood film, Zor, starring Sunny Deol. However, the film did not do well at the box office but the directorial ability of Sangeeth was well appreciated by many producers. After a brief gap he started working on Jackie Shroff's film Sandhya followed by Pantaloon's Chura Liyaa Hai Tumne.

Sangeeth Sivan's collaboration with Mohanlal in three of his films, namely Yodha, Gandharvam and Nirnayam have cult following.

In 2012, Sangeeth went to the UK to direct the comedy Yamla Pagla Deewana 2 along with the Deol family.

Filmography

References

External links
Official Facebook Profile

Loyola School, Thiruvananthapuram alumni
Living people
Year of birth missing (living people)
20th-century Indian film directors
Hindi-language film directors
21st-century Indian film directors
Film directors from Thiruvananthapuram
Malayalam screenwriters
Screenwriters from Thiruvananthapuram
20th-century Indian dramatists and playwrights
21st-century Indian dramatists and playwrights
Malayalam film producers
Hindi film producers